Will Phillips (born 22 May 2002) is an Australian rules footballer who plays for  in the Australian Football League (AFL).

Early football
Phillips began his junior career playing for the Beverley Hills Football Club in the Yarra Junior Football League, where he played over 100 games from the Auskick to the Under 15s division. He played school football for his school, Caulfield Grammar School, and was named as a co-captain of the school in his senior year. 2018 saw Phillips take out the most valuable player award in the AFL Under 16 championships. Phillips played for the Oakleigh Chargers in the NAB League in 2018 and 2019, playing a total of 15 games over the two seasons. He averaged 22 disposals in his 2019 season, and played a vital part in their grand final win, kicking 2 goals.

AFL career
On debut, Phillips was relatively quiet, collecting 9 disposals, 2 marks and 2 tackles.

Phillips did not play at AFL level in 2022 due to glandular fever, and only managed 3 VFL games.

Statistics
 Statistics are correct to the end of round 3, 2021.

|- style="background-color: #EAEAEA"
! scope="row" style="text-align:center" | 2021
|
| 29 || 16 || 3 || 4 || 71 || 81 || 152 || 31 || 33 || 0.19 || 0.25 || 4.44 || 5.06 || 9.5 || 1.94 || 2.06
|- style="background-color: #EAEAEA"
! scope="row" style="text-align:center" | 2022
|
| 29 || 0 || 0 || 0 || 0 || 0 || 0 || 0 || 0 || 0.0 || 0.0 || 0 || 0 || 0 || 0 || 0
|- class="sortbottom"
! colspan=3| Career
! 16
! 3
! 4
! 71
! 81
! 152
! 31
! 33
! 0.19
! 0.25
! 4.44
! 5.06
! 9.5
! 1.94
! 2.06
|}

References

External links

2002 births
Living people
North Melbourne Football Club players
Oakleigh Chargers players
Australian rules footballers from Victoria (Australia)
People educated at Caulfield Grammar School